Irseer Pegasus is a literary event of the Swabian regional group of the Association of German Writers (Verband deutscher Schriftsteller VS) and the Schwabenakademie Irsee, which takes place annually in January at the Irsee monastery. The authors' meeting promotes encounters and discussion within a workshop of writers from the fields of fiction, poetry. and essay writing. Joint textual discussion and literary discussion, as well as the awarding of a prize for literature, are the highpoints of the meeting.

Eligibility requirements
Authors should be able to demonstrate at least one independent book publication (not self-published) or to present comparable publications. Applications must be submitted by the end of October of the previous year at the latest. A jury evaluates the submitted texts, which must be able to be read in a maximum of 15 minutes.

Jury members are:
Ulrike Draesner, author and translator
Terézia Mora (2020)
Sylvia Heudecker, Director of Studies of the Schwabenakademie Irsee
Thomas Kraft, author and publisher, chairman of the Association of German Writers in Bavaria
Markus Orths, writer

Previous jury members included Rainer Jehl, Fritz Reutemann, Eva Leipprand, and Rainer Wochele.

Prices and awards
A special feature of the meeting is the fact that the authors participating in the workshop award one of the two prizes themselves. The following guidelines have applied since 2015: Each participant receives a sheet of paper with the names of the participating authors and can rate his competitors on a scale of 0 to 5. The author who scores the highest receives the prize in the amount of €2000 ($). Evaluation of the scores is done by employees of the Schwabenakademie. A second prize is awarded by the jury, which is also endowed with €2000.

Participation in the workshop and prize competition is possible up to three times, but prizewinners are not eligible to win again. The prize is considered a young talent award and is attentively followed by other literary professionals. Many of the prizewinners went on to receive later other, sometimes more significant prizes, such as the Feldkirch prize or the Dresden Poetry Prize.

Publications
In 2008, an anthology with selected texts from the workshop was issued for the 10th anniversary of the Irseer Pegasus. Luft unter den Flügeln (Air Beneath the Wings) was published by Klöpfer & Meyer and was presented with others at a reading in Bregenz.

Winners
 1999: Ernst T. Mader, Peter Dempf, Rainer Wochele
 2000: Stefan Monhardt, Bernhard Setzwein, Felicitas Andresen-Kohring
 2001: Max Sessner, Birgit Wiesner, Arwed Vogel
 2002: Markus Orths, Sylvie Gonsolin-Schenk, Nadja Sennewald
 2003: Hellmut Seiler, Volker Demuth, Jürgen-Thomas Ernst
 2004: Kai Weyand, Werner Baur, Peter Blickle
 2005: Ria Neumann, Wolfgang Sréter, Ferdinand Scholz
 2006: Carl-Christian Elze, Ralph Grüneberger, Silke Knäpper, Walle Sayer
 2007: Christoph Schwarz, Nathalie Schmid, Hartwig Mauritz, Jörg Neugebauer
 2008: Martin Strauß, Konrad Roenne, Dominik Dombrowski, Jutta Reichelt
 2009: Armin Steigenberger, Inka Kleinke-Bialy, Anja Kampmann, Hedy Sadoc
 2010: Thilo Krause, Carmen Kotarski, Anke Laufer, Axel Görlach, Robert Blunder
 2011: Silke Heimes, Thomas Josef Wehlim, Thomas Steiner, Norbert Mayer
 2012: Manuela Bibrach, Moritz Heger, Maya Rinderer, Ludwig Rapp
 2013: Harald Jöllinger, Kerstin Becker, Helmut Glatz, Daniel Ableev
 2014: Birgit Kreipe, Gertraud Klemm, Ulrike Schäfer
 2015: Birgit Birnbacher, Ulrich Effenhauser
 2016: Adi Traar, Michael Lichtwarck-Aschoff
 2017: Kai Bleifuß, David Krause
 2018: Martin Piekar, Mario Schlembach
 2019: Peter Zimmermann
 2020: Ilija Matusko
 2021: Melanie Khoshmashrab, Kathrin Niemela

Guest authors
 2000 Ulrike Längle
 2001 Anna Mitgutsch
 2002 Andreas Maier
 2003 Angela Kraus
 2007 Angelika Overath
 2008 Gert Heidenreich
 2009 Karl-Heinz Ott
 2010 Matthias Politycki
 2011 Dagmar Leupold
 2012 Thomas Lehr
 2013 Ulrich Pinion

References

External links

Awards established in 1999
Poetry awards
Literary awards of Bavaria
1999 establishments in Germany